Neosprucea sararensis is a species of flowering plant in the family Salicaceae. It is found only in Colombia.

References

Salicaceae
Endangered plants
Endemic flora of Colombia
Taxonomy articles created by Polbot